The Soul of a Horse (Mare With Foal) was an award-winning 1963 photo taken by the German photojournalist and Stern magazine staffer Peter Thomann.

In the mid-1970s the Kentucky Horse Park near Lexington opened to the public, using a logo based on the photograph. The icon of the dark colored mare and a light colored foal in mid-run was used to create the Kentucky Horse Park specialty license plate. In the late 1990s, Thomann sued, and the icon was removed from the license plate. The horse park made an agreement with Thomann and kept their logo with his permission.

See also
Vehicle registration plates of Kentucky

References

1963 works
1963 in art
Black-and-white photographs
Works originally published in German magazines
Works originally published in news magazines
Horses in art
1960s photographs